Colin Keith-Johnston  (8 October 1896 - 3 January 1980) was a British actor.

Keith-Johnston was born in London, the son of Robert Keith-Johnston and  Jessy Macfie, and was a prominent actor of the stage. As well as film appearances, he appeared onstage as Stanhope in the first production of Journey's End in the United States.

He played hero Mr. Darcy in Helen Jerome's Broadway-hit adaptation of Pride and Prejudice at the Music Box Theatre in 1935. This was a notable role, the first to make Darcy a central part of the love story and to emphasize throughout the play the character's passion for and physical attraction to heroine Elizabeth Bennet. Colin married Margaret Cookson (cousin of actors Marjorie Browne and Joy Launor Heyes) and their son Hugo Keith-Johnston born in 1954 was a successful child actor who appeared in Not In Front of the Children (1968) for BBC Television with Ronald Hines and Wendy Craig.

He fought in World War One as an officer in the Bedfordshire Regiment and was awarded an MC in the 1917 New Year Honours.  The citation said that it was awarded for: "For conspicuous gallantry in action. He rallied men of several units, led them forward, and captured many prisoners. He continued at duty until relieved, although wounded three times."

Filmography

Notes

References
 Bordman, Gerald Martin (1995). American Theatre: A Chronicle of Comedy and Drama, 1914-1930. Oxford University Press US. .

External links
 

1896 births
1980 deaths
British Army personnel of World War I
English male stage actors
English male film actors
Recipients of the Military Cross
20th-century English male actors